Transvergence (1999) is a compilation book of science fiction novels by American writer Charles Sheffield. Sometimes listed as a 6th book of the Heritage Universe series of novels, Transvergence is actually a compilation of book 3, Transcendence (published in 1992) and book 4, Convergence (published in 1997).  The title, Transvergence is a mashup of those novels' titles.

References
 Conor O'Connor, "Review of Transvergence," Rambles, a cultural arts magazine (21 September 2002)

1999 American novels
1999 science fiction novels
American science fiction novels